The Lopez Heritage House or Mansion de Lopez (or otherwise known as the Nelly's Garden) is a national heritage house built in 1928 located at Jaro, Iloilo City by an Ilonggo statesman Don Vicente Lopez and his wife, Doña Elena Hofileña. The mansion was named after the couple's eldest daughter,  Nelly Lopez y Hofileña. Due to its grandiose architecture highlighting the province's aristocratic past, it is regarded as the "Queen of Heritage Houses in Iloilo". On March 28, 2004, it was declared as a National Historical Landmark by the National Historical Institute.

The house and its  property are open for public tours and events.

History
Vicente Lopez used to live near the Jaro Cathedral with his wife, Elena Hofilena, but the constant sound of the cannons fired during religious activities during those times eventually led to the family's decision to transfer their home to a more peaceful location. They eventually settled approximately one kilometer from the town center. The construction of the mansion was finished by 1928, and the couple decided to name the house in honor of their eldest daughter.

During the World War II in the Philippines, the mansion was very nearly burned down to the ground by Filipino guerrillas commandeered by an Ilonggo general to raze every mansion in the province so to prevent it from serving as the headquarters for the invading Japanese soldiers. The-then occupants Lilia Lopez-Jison (3rd child of Don Vicente and Dona Elena) and her husband begged the guerillas to spare the house. Just as kerosene is poured around the place, a squad of Japanese soldiers came and a heavy gunfight ensued. By the end of the war, the house survived in one piece.

In its lifetime, the house served as a venue for receptions and meetings with Governor-Generals of the Philippines including Frank Murphy and Teddy Roosevelt Jr., Thailand's Prince Chupra, Former First Lady Imelda Marcos and late president Cory Aquino.

Due to its cultural and architectural prominence, the National Historical Institute placed a historical marker on it, declaring it to be a National Heritage House on March 28, 2004.

Architecture
The house is in Beaux-Arts style influenced by Western aesthetics. evident on its facade. It is designed to portray the extravagant lifestyle of Iloilo's most affluent families during the American colonial era in the Philippines. Profusely adorned with ornately carved columns and pilasters, the house is constructed to look imposing outside just as it does inside. Two set of wooden stairs lead to the family cavernous common room where most of the furniture and paintings are placed. Even the poster beds in its rooms at the second floor are carefully preserved for public viewing. High up in the ceiling are crystal chandeliers that give off a soft, warm glow, illuminated the wooden brandishing that serves as an elaborate divider to each room.

In the centerpiece of the dining room is a hexagonal table which can sit up to twenty-four guests. A huge chandelier hangs from the ceiling which is fifteen-feet high. The door-length windows allows the light to get inside the room, creating a bright atmosphere as the guests dine together.

References

Historic house museums in the Philippines
Heritage Houses in the Philippines
Houses completed in 1928
Buildings and structures in Iloilo City
Tourist attractions in Iloilo City
20th-century architecture in the Philippines